Albanian cuisine is a representative of the cuisine of the Mediterranean. It is also an example of the Mediterranean diet based on the importance of olive oil, fruits, vegetables and fish. The cooking traditions of the Albanian people are diverse in consequence of the environmental factors that are more importantly suitable for the cultivation of nearly every kind of herbs, vegetables and fruits. Olive oil is the most ancient and commonly used vegetable fat in Albanian cooking, produced since antiquity throughout the country particularly along the coasts.

Hospitality is a fundamental custom of Albanian society and serving food is integral to the hosting of guests and visitors. It is not infrequent for visitors to be invited to eat and drink with locals. The medieval Albanian code of honour, called besa, resulted to look after guests and strangers as an act of recognition and gratitude.

Albanian cuisine can be divided into three major regional cuisines. The cuisine of the northern region has a rural, coastal and mountainous origin. Meat, fish and vegetables are central to the cuisine of the northern region. The people there use many kinds of ingredients, which usually grow in the region including potatoes, carrots, maizes, beans, cabbages but also cherries, walnuts and almonds. Garlic and onions are as well important components to the local cuisine and added to almost every dish.

The cuisine of the central region is threefold of rural, mountainous and coastal. The central region is the flattest and rich in vegetation and biodiversity as well as culinary specialties. It has Mediterranean characteristics due to its proximity to the sea, which is rich in fish. Dishes here include several meat specialties and desserts of all kinds.

In the south, the cuisine is composed of two components:  the rural products of the field including dairy products, citrus fruits and olive oil, and coastal products, i.e. seafood. Those regions are particularly conducive to raising animals, as pastures and feed resources are abundant.

Besides garlic, onions are arguably the country's most widely used ingredient. Albania is ranked fourth in the world in terms of onion consumption per capita.

History

Characteristics and meals 

The location of Albania in the western Balkan Peninsula and on the Mediterranean Sea has a large influence on Albanian cuisine. Many foods that are common in the Mediterranean Basin, such as olives, wheat, chickpeas, dairy products, fish, fruits and vegetables, are prominent in the Albanian cooking tradition. Albania has a distinctly Mediterranean climate. Across the country, a range of microclimates due to differing soil types and topography allows a variety of products to be grown. Citrus fruits such as oranges and lemons, figs and olives thrive.

Every region has its own typical breakfast. Breakfast is generally light. Bread is common, served with butter, cheese, jam and yogurt, and accompanied with olives, coffee, milk, tea or raki. Trahaná (tarhana) is also a common breakfast in many rural areas. It is common to have only fruit or a slice of bread and a cup of coffee or tea for breakfast. Coffee and tea are enjoyed both in homes and in cafés.

Lunch is traditionally the biggest meal of the day, for everyone from school children to shop workers and government officials. In the past, people went home to have lunch with their families, but it is now common to have lunch with friends at restaurants or cafeterias. Lunch sometimes consists of gjellë, a main dish of slowly cooked meat with various vegetables, accompanied by a salad of fresh vegetables, such as tomatoes, cucumbers, green peppers, onions and olives. Salads are typically served with meat dishes and are dressed with salt, olive oil, white vinegar or lemon juice. Grilled or fried vegetables and sausages and various forms of omelettes are also eaten. Common beverages are coffee, tea, fruit juices and milk.

Supper in Albania is a smaller meal, often consisting only of a variety of breads, meat, fresh fish or seafood, cheese, eggs and various kind of vegetables, similar to breakfast, or possibly sandwiches.

Ingredients 

Located in Southern Europe with a direct proximity to the Mediterranean Sea, the Albanian cuisine features a wide range of fresh fruits, growing naturally in the fertile Albanian soil and under the warm sun. In consideration of being an agricultural country, Albania is a significant fruit importer and exporter. Besides citrus fruits, cherries, strawberries, blueberries and raspberries are among the most cultivated fruits. Many Albanians keep fruit trees in their yards. Fresh and dried fruits are eaten as snacks and desserts.

Fruits that are traditionally associated with Albanian cuisine include apple, grape, olive, orange, nectarine, blackberry, cherry, persimmon, pomegranate, figs, watermelon, avocado, lemon, peach, plum, strawberries, raspberry, mulberry and cornelian cherry.

A wide variety of vegetables are frequently used in Albanian cooking. Due to the different climate and soil conditions across Albania, cultivars of cabbages, turnips, beetroots, beans, potatoes, leeks and mushrooms can be found in a rich variety. Dried or pickled vegetables are also processed, especially in drier or colder regions such as in the remote Albanian Alps, where fresh vegetables were hard to get out of season. Particularly used vegetables include onion, garlic, tomato, cucumber, carrot, pepper, spinach, lettuce, grape leaves, bean, eggplant and zucchini.

Herbs are very popular. A wide variety are readily available at supermarkets or local produce stands across the country. The proximity to the Mediterranean Sea and the ideal climatic conditions allows the cultivation of about 250 aromatic and medical plants. Albania is among the leading producers and exporter of herbs in the world. Further, the country is a worldwide significant producer of oregano, thyme, sage, salvia, rosemary and yellow gentian. Most commonly used herbs and other seasonings in Albanian cooking include artichoke, basil, chili pepper, cinnamon, coriander, lavender, oregano, peppermint, rosemary, thyme, bay, vanilla, saffron.

Drinks 

Tea is a widely consumed beverage throughout Albania and particularly served at cafés, restaurants or at home. The country is rich in the cultivation of a wide range of herbs. The most popular varieties of tea drinking in Albania include Albanian-style mountain tea, which grows in the Albanian mountains and villages, and Russian- and Turkish-style black tea with sugar to tea with lemon, milk or honey.

Coffee is another popular beverage in Albania, but more particularly in the cities and villages. There are various varieties of coffee popular in Albania, such as espresso, cappuccino, macchiato, mocha and latte. As Albania was formerly part of the Ottoman Empire, coffee in the Turkish style is also common. Filter coffee and instant coffee are also available. Cafés are found everywhere in urban areas and function as meeting places for socializing and conducting business. Almost all serve baked goods and sandwiches and many also serve light meals. Tirana is particularly well known for its café culture.

In 2016, Albania surpassed Spain by becoming the country with the most coffee houses per capita in the world. In fact, there are 654 coffee houses per 100,000 inhabitants in Albania, a country with only 2.5 million inhabitants.

Dhallë is a traditional and healthy yogurt-based drink in Albania made by blending yogurt with water or milk and spices. It is especially popular during the summer month and it may be served with salt, according to taste.

Boza, is a malt drink made from maize (corn) and wheat which is widely consumed with desserts in Albania.

Raki is the most popular spirit in Albania. It is considered as the national spirit beverage of the country. The most common types of raki in the country are grape, plum or blackberry. It is commonly served to the older people and is heated and sweetened with honey or sugar, with added spices. Although in the south of the country, Raki rigoni is very popular among the people and is made of white oregano, that is cultivated in the region.

Albania is a traditionally wine drinking country. The people of Albania drink wine in moderation and almost always at meals or social occasions. Islam is the majority religion in Albania and while observant Muslims tend to avoid the consumption of alcohol, it is available in the country. Albanians drink about 5.83 liters of wine per person per year, which has been increasing since the Albanian production of high-quality wine grows to meet demand. The origins of wine production in Albania can be traced back to 6,000 years and evidence suggesting wine production confirm that Albania is among the earliest wine producers in Europe.

Pastries and desserts 

There is a strong tradition of home baking in the country and pâtisseries are present in every city and village across the country. Entirely Albanian desserts and pastries consist primarily of fruits including oranges and lemons that grow as well as in the country. Traditionally, fresh fruits are often eaten after a meal as a dessert. Those dishes are inspired from both Western and Eastern civilizations.

Kanojët is a typical Sicilian pastry and very common among the Arbëreshë people, which brought that dish back into their homelands, Albania where it is popular. It is made of tube-shaped shells of fried pastry dough, filled with a sweet, creamy filling usually containing ricotta. The kanojët from Piana degli Albanesi, an Arbëreshë village, are often referred to be the best cannolo.

Baklava is made frequently in Albania, especially around certain religious holidays of Muslims, Catholics and Orthodox. It is prepared on large trays and cut into a variety of shapes. Baklava is either with hazelnuts or walnuts sweetened with syrup.

Petulla is a traditional fried dough made from wheat or buckwheat flour, which is as well a popular dish among the Albanians and served with powdered sugar or feta cheese and raspberry jam.

Pandispanjë is a traditional base for several Albanian desserts and cakes based on flour, sugar, butter and eggs. A variety of fillings are used, such as jelly, chocolate, fruit and pastry cream.

Ballokume is an Albanian cookie, which originated in Elbasan during the Middle Ages and prepared every year on Summer Day, a public holiday in the country. It has to be brewed in large copper pots, tightly whipped with a wooden spoon and baked in a wood oven.

Fruit jam, also known as Reçel, is enjoyed all year in Albania and a major component of the Albanian cooking tradition. The fruit preserve is made by cooking the juice of the fruit or the fruit itself, which usually grow in Albania, with sugar. It is served to many dishes as a side dish.

Zupa is a popular dessert and assembled by alternating layers of  cookies or sponge cake with pastry cream. Another similar dessert is an Albanian custard dessert called krem karamele very similar to crème brûlée. This dessert is made with milk, cream, egg yolks, sugar, vanilla and flavored with orange or lemon zest and cinnamon.
 

Various kinds of hallvë are prepared across the country with some of the most common types being flour halva. Although home-cooked semolina halva and shop-produced sesame halva are also consumed. It is a typical sweet in local religious fairs around Albania.

Tambëloriz, also known as sultjash, is a popular sweet among the Albanian population across the world. It is a kind of rice pudding made from milk, rice, cinnamon and nuts, raisins can be added, too.

Tollumba is a fried, crispy, and sweet dessert traditionally eaten in the Balkan Peninsula. Further, it is made of bits of fried dough, similar to doughnuts, steeped in much lemony syrup. The dough contains starch and semolina, which keeps it light and crispy.

Akullore is the Albanian word for ice cream and it is enjoyed both summer and winter.

Kadaif is a pastry made from long thin noodle threads filled with walnuts or pistachios and sweetened with syrup, it is sometimes served alongside baklava.

Kabuni is a traditional cold-served Albanian dessert made of rice fried in butter, mutton broth, raisins, salt and caramelized sugar. It is then boiled before sugar, cinnamon, and ground cloves are added.
 

Pastashu is made from choux pastry, filled with a cream, vanilla, coffee or chocolate-flavoured custard and then topped usually with fondant icing. This dessert is known as Éclair in France and Bignè in Italy

Trileçe is an Albanian adaptation of the Spanish Tres leches. It is a sponge cake made of three milks from cow's, goat's and water buffaloes, while cow's milk and cream are used commonly. According to Hürriyet, Albania was the first country to introduce the dessert from South America into the area. It is believed that the popularity of Brazilian soap operas in Albania led local chefs to reverse-engineer the dessert and then the speciality spread over to Turkey.

Ashure, the world oldest dessert, is served especially during Muslim (Bektashi) holidays in Albania. It is a congee that is made of a mixture consisting of grains, nuts as well as fruits and dried fruits.

Homemade panettone, an Italian type of sweet bread loaf, is usually prepared and particularly enjoyed for Christmas and New Year in Albania. 

Lokum is a Turkish candy eaten in Albania.

Appetizers and salads 

Popular appetizers in Albania includes wheat bread or cornbread, which remains one of the most important foods and are ever-present on the Albanian table. Hence the expression for 'going to eat a meal' (Albanian: për të ngrënë bukë) can be literally translated as 'going to eat bread'. In Albania, bread is also used in the authentic Albanian hospitality saying of "bread, salt and heart" (bukë, kripë e zemër).

Vegetable salads are almost served along with both lunch and dinner, which in majority are dishes based on meat. The ingredients that are used always in salads are green or red peppers, onions, tomatoes, olives and cucumbers. Salads that are representative of the Albanian cuisine are dressed with salt, olive oil or lemon and vinegar. The usual dressings are based on garlic, lemon and black pepper.

An Albanian-style meze of fresh and cooked vegetable salads, pickled cucumbers and other vegetables, hard boiled eggs, prosciutto ham, salami and feta cheese, accompanied with roasted bell peppers, olive oil and garlic is served at festive meals and in restaurants. Nowadays, the modern interpretations of the Albanian meze blend traditional and modern combination of various appetizers.

Fërgesë verorë (summer fërgesë) is the vegetarian version of fërgesë, a national dish in Albania made of green and red peppers, along with skinned tomatoes and onions and often served as a side dish to various meat dishes.

Japrak is a stuffed vegetable dish made with grape leaves, olive oil and stuffed with rice, grilled beef and chopped onions and generally served cold with bread and tarator.

Tarator is a cold appetizer and usually served cold as a side dish during the hot summer months. The ingredients of tarator include cucumber, garlic, olive oil, salt and yoghurt. Fried and grilled vegetables and seafood are usually offered with tarator.

Large white kidney beans (fasulle plaqi) are a typical appetizer or side dish, baked in an earthen pot with tomatoes, onions, peppermint, oregano, bay leaves and black pepper.

A variety of soups are enjoyed, particularly in the winter. Especially popular soups are potato, cabbage, bean and fish soups. Trahana is a popular soup in the Eastern Mediterranean. It based on a fermented mixture of wheat and fermented milk. Other dishes include Groshët and Shqeto, which originated from Lunxheri region of Gjirokastër.

Other dishes include mëlci pule, eggplant appetizers, panaret which is famous among Arbëreshës, stuffed peppers composed of green peppers stuffed with rice, meat, other vegetables and herbs, turshi lakre, fried sardele me Limon, papare, which are bread leftovers cooked with water, egg, butter, and Gjizë (salted curd cheese) and bread and cheese referred as Bukë me djathë.

Meat and fish 

The country's cuisine is largely meat-based. Beef and veal are the most commonly consumed meats in Albania, followed by pork. Albania has many small eateries specializing in beef and lamb, goat and veal. In high elevation localities, smoked meat and pickled preserves are common. Animal organs are also used in dishes such as intestines and the head among other parts, which are considered a delicacy.

Fresh fish is readily available and caught off the coastal areas of the Adriatic and Ionian Sea inside the Mediterranean Sea but also from the Lake Butrint, Lake Shkodër, Lake Ohrid, Lake Prespa as well as Karavasta Lagoon, Narta Lagoon and Patos Lagoon. Fresh fish is served whole, in the Mediterranean style, grilled, boiled, fried whole or in slices, dressed only with freshly squeezed lemon juice. Fish dishes are often flavoured with white vinegar and virgin olive oil, which particularly grows in Southern Albania.

Albanians living on the coastal cities, especially in Durrës, Sarandë and Vlorë are passionate about their seafood specialties. Popular seafood dishes include trout, calamari, octopus, cuttlefish, red mullet, sea bass, gilt-head bream and other. Baked whiting, carp, mullet or eel with olive oil and garlic are also widely consumed in the country.
 

Fërgesë is the most iconic dish from Tirana and Central Albania. Ingredients are cooked on the stove and then in the oven to make a relatively dense sauce. Some versions of the dish include liver or cooked beef. Fërgesë with liver is considered more traditional in Tirana and is thus sometimes called just fërgesë tirane.

Tavë kosi is a national dish in Albania that is beloved throughout the country. The speciality is a simple dish of baked lamb and rice, served with a flavored yogurt sauce. Recently, it has become very popular among the Greeks and Turks associated to the large Albanian diaspora in Greece and Turkey.

Qebapa are small homemade grilled meat skinless sausages made of lamb and beef mix. It is primarily served with onions, sour cream, ajvar and pita bread called pitalka.

Gullash, or tasqebap, is actually eaten very frequently in the mountainous areas of Albania. It's a traditional paprika-spiced meat stew originating in Hungary that is popular throughout Central Europe and the Balkans.

Gjel deti me përshesh (turkey with përshesh) is the usual New Year's dish in many Albanian families and also consumed in other kind of celebrations. Turkey is first boiled and then roasted and served with përshesh, which is prepared by baking pieces of kulaç (a kind of bread) with turkey broth, along with mint and other spices.

Paçe is traditionally common in Albania. It is made with a sheep's, pig's or any cattle's head, boiled until meat comes off easily. It is then stewed with garlic, onion, black pepper and vinegar. Sometimes a little flour is added to thicken the stew.

Proshute is a term used in Albania for many types of salami and ham, which has been seasoned, cured and air-dried. It is served rather at breakfast or lunch as an appetizer.

Qofte are fried meatballs, which are usually made of minced meat, herbs and spices and cooked with tomato sauce and vegetables or beans. Throughout the country there are few specialized shops called , which offer qofte and beer.

Mimilige is made of cornmeal that is boiled in water with the intestines of lamb, butter, cheese and corn flour. This warm dish can be baked, grilled, fried or served creamy. It is a very prominent dish in the Labëria region.

Pies 

Pite is considered as well as one of the national food of Albania and most of Albanians.  Several internationally renowned musicians of Albanian heritage such as Rita Ora, Dua Lipa and Action Bronson spread their passion about this Albanian dish.

It is often served hot, fresh and with pickled vegetables, honey, yogurt or fruit jam. Nowadays, flia mainly features in large social gatherings, weddings, births and other ceremonies and events. Fli is a dish mainly cooked in Kosovo. It is important to note that the dishes may differ depending on the region of Albania.
Bakllasarëm is a layered pie, otherwise known as pite, without anything inside, which is covered with yogurt and garlic and then heated again. It is particularly eaten for lunch. Another popular dish is Kungullur, which is made of filo pastry layers filled with mashed pumpkin, butter, salt or sugar.

Notable pies include Byrek, Pepeq, Shaprak, Qollopita or Lakror. Lakror is a pie that has layers of dough thinner than a byrek and it is traditionally cooked on embers, covered with a metal semispherical lid. Common fillings are leek and gjizë or tomato and onion. It is a specialty of Southern Albanian regions, like Lunxheri or Korça.

Health effects 

Albanian cuisine falls within the category of the "Mediterranean diet," which includes a high consumption of seafood, vegetables, fruit, nuts, and olive oil; however, beef, veal, lamb, and pork are commonly consumed as well. It is believed that because of this diet Albania has a very high life expectancy when its economic power is compared to other countries, characterized by some researchers as the "Albanian paradox".

See also 

 Culture of Albania
 Mediterranean cuisine
 Arbëreshë cuisine
 Kosovan cuisine
 Albanian wine
 Mediterranean diet

References 

 

 
Albanian culture
European cuisine
Mediterranean cuisine
Balkan cuisine

pt:Cultura da Albânia#Culinária